A gilliflower or gillyflower is:
The carnation or a similar plant of the genus Dianthus, especially the Clove Pink Dianthus caryophyllus.
Matthiola incana, also known as stock.
Several other plants, such as the wallflower, which have fragrant flowers.
The name derives from the French giroflée from Greek karyophyllon = "nut-leaf" = the spice called clove, the association deriving from the flower's scent.

Gilliflowers have been claimed to be used as payment for peppercorn rent in medieval feudal tenure contracts. For example, in 1262 in Bedfordshire an area of land called The Hyde was held by someone "for the rent of one clove of gilliflower", and Elmore Court in Gloucester was granted to the Guise family by John De Burgh for the rent of "The clove of one Gillyflower" each year. In Kent in the 13th century Bartholomew de Badlesmere upon an exchange made between King Edward I and himself, received a royal grant in fee of a manor and chapel, to hold in socage, "by the service of paying one pair of clove gilliflowers", by the hands of the Sheriff. However, it is more likely that the rent was paid in the form of actual cloves (in Latin, gariofilum; the flower was later named after the spice, via French), cloves and peppercorns both being exotic spices. 

The rose and gillyflower appear on the station badge of RAF Waterbeach in Cambridgeshire, and subsequently on the badge of 39 Engineer Regiment based at Waterbeach Barracks. A rose and gillyflower were demanded by the owner of the land on which Waterbeach Abbey was built, in the 12th century.

An old recipe for gilliflower wine is mentioned in the Cornish Recipes Ancient & Modern dated to 1753:

Gilliflowers are mentioned by Mrs. Lovett in the song "Wait" from the Sondheim musical Sweeney Todd and in the novel La Faute de l'Abbé Mouret (aka Abbe Mouret's Transgression or the Sin of the Father Mouret) by Émile Zola as part of the Les Rougon-Macquart series. Charles Ryder has them growing under his window when he is a student at Oxford in the novel Brideshead Revisited. Shakespeare's Perdita is scathing about gilliflowers, or "streaked gillyvors" in Act IV, Sc 4 of his Winter's Tale, because they are cross-fertilized by humans, rather than by Nature: "I have heard it said/There is an art which in their piedness shares/With great creating Nature ... I'll not put/The dibble in earth to set one slip of them". In the ballad Clerk Saunders, the ghost of Saunders tells May Margaret of the fate of those women who die in labour: "Their beds are made in the heavens high,/Down at the foot of our good Lord’s knee,/Weel set about wi’ gillyflowers;/I wot, sweet company for to see."

Notes

References
dated 1753, from St. Stephens W.I. in Cornish Recipes, Ancient & Modern, 22nd Edition, The Cornwall Federation of Women's Institutes 1965. First published by Edith Martin, Tregavethan, Truro, 1929, for The Cornwall F. of W. I.

External links

 
 

Plant common names